The Dupee Estate, located at 400 Beacon Street in the village of Chestnut Hill, Newton, Massachusetts, was the last home of Mary Baker Eddy, the founder of Christian Science.

Property description
The property consists of an  tract of land with a combination gate and carriage house located near the entrance from Beacon Street and the main house located to its southeast. There are also two smaller out buildings located southwest of the carriage house.

Main house
The architecture of the main house built in 1880–1881 has been described variously as "Ruskinian Gothic" or "Gothic, Stick/Eastlake." The architects were thought to be Peabody & Stearns, although no plans or evidence exists to prove this. The estate was added to the National Register on September 4, 1986, as outbuilding 86001790.

The exterior walls are of puddingstone, granite and blue stone blocks, with brick window and door surrounds. The hip roof is black slate with red copper pans with multiple dormers and skylights. A major renovation of the mansion was undertaken in 1907–1908 to the designs of Chicago-based architect Solon Spencer Beman, in preparation for occupancy by Mary Baker Eddy and her executive staff and household helpers. The renovation transformed the massing and layout of the original mansion, introduced two elevators inside, and added a substantial new wing in the style of the original. (Beman had previously been the architect for Eddy on the design of the Extension of the Mother Church in Boston, as documented in Paul Eli Ivey's Prayers in Stone.)

Outbuildings
The gate-carriage house, built in 1892, has  of space, while the garage has only .

History

Prior to Eddy
According to both Mary Baker Eddy Library and National Park Service sites, the main house was built in 1880 by William Arthur Dupee, but this does not seem plausible since he was born on November 30, 1871. It seems more probable that it was built by his father, William Richardson Dupee, who was born August 10, 1841, in Brighton and died January 19, 1911, in Brookline. In 1895 the estate was sold by the Dupee family to R. Ashton Lawrence.

Eddy years
Mary Baker Eddy bought the estate from R. Ashton Lawrence in October 1907, but she did not move in until after the addition had been completed in 1908. She used the house not only as her home but also as the office from which she oversaw the management of the church she had founded. Eddy died at home on December 3, 1910, and was buried in Mount Auburn Cemetery.

After Eddy
The estate at 400 Beacon Street was bequeathed by Eddy to her church which, for decades, maintained it as she had left it. It was open to the public for many years until escalating costs as well as the need for major repairs and renovations led the church to close it to the public. In April 2006, the church announced it would sell the house as part of an overall plan to reduce its involvement in managing real estate and to instead focus on its "spiritual priorities".

In December 2006 Longyear Museum, an organization dedicated to "advancing the understanding of the life and work of Mary Baker Eddy" and which owns several houses associated with her, purchased her last home from the church for $13,301,027. The sale did not include the furnishings and artifacts that had been in the home since her death in 1910. These were removed by the church before closing. In March 2007, Longyear paid $156,000 to obtain some pieces of furniture, rugs, and five of the seven carriages from the estate. Longyear hopes to be able to buy more personal property from the church in the future.

Longyear is currently repairing and restoring the house, but does lead tours (arranged in advance) through the essentially empty house, using photographs to show how it looked when in use.

See also
National Register of Historic Places listings in Newton, Massachusetts
Mary Baker Eddy Historic House for a list of the eight houses owned by the Longyear Museum.

References

External links

 Longyear website

Houses on the National Register of Historic Places in Newton, Massachusetts
Historic house museums in Massachusetts
Christian Science in Massachusetts
Solon Spencer Beman buildings
Houses completed in 1881
1881 establishments in Massachusetts
Mary Baker Eddy